Mad Dogs and Englishmen is a BBC Books original novel written by Paul Magrs and based on the long-running British science fiction television series Doctor Who. It features the Eighth Doctor, Fitz and Anji.

Plot
A race of alien poodles alters a 20th-century fantasy epic to aid their civil war.

The Doctor infiltrates a groups of writers known as the Smudgelings, Anji experiences some very, very special effects in 1970s America and Fitz meets an old friend.

The book also features a jolly hotel chef and dogs with opposable thumbs.

Tolkien
The novel contains a spoof of J. R. R. Tolkien's experiences writing The Lord of the Rings. The character representing C. S. Lewis in this also appears in Magrs's non-Doctor Who novel To the Devil — a Diva! and the Smudgelings reappear in his novel Something Borrowed. Another character represents Ray Harryhausen.

Cameo
Noël Coward plays a major role in the novel. The title of the book is based on the classic Noël Coward song Mad Dogs and Englishmen.
John Major makes a short cameo in the climactic scene at the 'Champagne Supernova' club.

External links

2002 British novels
2002 science fiction novels
Eighth Doctor Adventures
British science fiction novels
Novels by Paul Magrs